The 2008–09 Premier Reserve League (officially known as the 2008–09 Barclays Premier Reserve League for sponsorship reasons) is the tenth season since the establishment of the Premier Reserve League. The season began on 1 September 2008, and ended with the play-off final on 21 May 2009.

The events in the senior leagues during the 2007–08 season saw Birmingham City, Derby County and Reading all relegated and replaced by the promoted teams Hull City, Stoke City, and West Bromwich Albion.

Sunderland won Premier Reserve League North title after beating Manchester City 3–0 on 14 April 2009. Aston Villa sealed the Premier Reserve League South title for a second successive season with a 2–0 win over West Bromwich Albion on 27 April.

On 21 May, Aston Villa were crowned the 2008–09 Premier Reserve League Champions after a 3–1 win against Sunderland in the Play-off Final at Villa Park. It is Aston Villa Reserves' first national title.

Tables

Premier Reserve League North

Premier Reserve League South

Rules for classification: 1st points; 2nd goal difference; 3rd goals scoredPos = Position; Pld = Matches played; W = Matches won; D = Matches drawn; L = Matches lost; F = Goals for; A = Goals against; GD = Goal difference; Pts = Points; C = Champions

Play-off Final

Top scorers

Premier Reserve League North

Premier Reserve League South

Promotion and relegation
Teams relegated from the Premier Reserve League at the end of this season:
 West Bromwich Albion Reserves (South)
 Middlesbrough Reserves (North)
 Newcastle United Reserves (North)
Teams promoted to the Premier Reserve League next season:
 Wolverhampton Wanderers Reserves (South)
 Birmingham City Reserves (South)
 Burnley Reserves (North)

See also
Premier Academy League 2008–09
FA Youth Cup 2008–09
Premier League 2008–09
2008–09 in English football

Match reports

External links
Premier Reserve League 2008–09 tables
Premier Reserve League 2008–09 results (north)
Premier Reserve League 2008–09 results (south)

2008-09
Pr
Reserve